Kaiser is the German word for "emperor", usually reserved for the emperors of the German and Austrian Empires.

Kaiser may also refer to:

People 
Kaiser (surname), including a list of persons with the name
Kaiser (Burmese singer), a pop singer of Myanmar
"Kaiser" or "Kaiser Franz", both nicknames of Franz Beckenbauer, former German football player, coach, and manager
Kaiser Gates (born 1996), American basketball player for Hapoel Jerusalem of the Israeli Basketball Premier League
"The Kaiser", nickname of Ralf Souquet, a German professional pool player

Places 
Kaiser, Missouri, United States
Kaiser, Wisconsin, a ghost town in the United States
Kaiser Mountains, a mountain range in the Alps
Kaiser (Martian crater), a crater on Mars
Kaiser (lunar crater), a crater on the Moon

Arts and entertainment
Kaiser (card game), a card game
Kaiser (video game), a video game
Digimon Kaiser a character from Digimon Adventure

Brands and enterprises
Related to Henry J. Kaiser:
KaiserAir, an airline, charter and service company
Kaiser Aluminum, an aluminum company
Kaiser Broadcasting, an entity that owned and operated broadcast television stations in the United States, 1958–77
Kaiser Center, a skyscraper building in Oakland, California
Kaiser Motors, an automobile trademark
Kaiser Permanente, a health maintenance organization (HMO) based in the U.S. state of California
Kaiser Shipyards, part of Kaiser Shipbuilding Company
Kaiser Steel, a former steelmaking company that was based in California
Kaiser Foundation
HTC Kaiser, an alternate name for the HTC TyTN II Pocket PC phone
Kaiser brewery, a Brazilian brewery
Kaiser's (supermarket), a German supermarket chain

Computing and technology
KAISER, an alternate name for kernel page-table isolation, a security method
Kaiser window, a window function used for digital signal processing

Ships 

, a screw ship of the line of the Austro-Hungarian fleet
SMS Kaiser (1875), a German cruiser launched in 1875
SMS Kaiser (1911), a German battleship launched in 1911
Henry J. Kaiser-class replenishment oiler, a United States Navy class of replenishment oilers
USNS Henry J. Kaiser (T-AO-187), a U.S. Navy fleet replenishment oiler in Military Sealift Command service since 1986

Other uses 
 Kaisers, the space police from Brave Exkaiser
Kaiser Burnout, a fire set by Confederate Captain James Kaiser during the American Civil War
Kaiser (horse), a New Zealand Thoroughbred racehorse
Kaiser pear, or Bosc pear, a pear cultivar
Kaiser roll, a type of bread roll
Kaiser test, a chemical test for the presence of primary amines using ninhydrin

See also 
Kaisar (disambiguation)
Kayser (disambiguation)
Keiser (disambiguation)
Keyser (disambiguation)
Qeysar (disambiguation)
Caesar (disambiguation)
Qaisar, given name in the Middle East, Arabic version of Caesar respectively Kaiser